Herbert Green may refer to:

 Herbert John Green (1850–?), English architect
 Herbert S. Green (1920–1999), British physicist
 J. Herbert Green, member of the Wisconsin State Senate
 Herbert Green (cricketer), English cricketer and British Army officer
 Herb Green (1916–2001), New Zealand doctor whose "Unfortunate Experiment" was the subject of the Cartwright Inquiry

See also
 Herbert Greene (disambiguation)
Bert Green (disambiguation)